The Shenyang HU-1 Seagull is a Chinese powered glider built by the Shenyang Sailplane Factory at Shenyang.

Design
The Seagull is a two-seat powered glider made from aluminium alloy with parts also made of wood, glassfibre and fabric. It has an overwing mounted  Lycoming O-235-N2A engine.

Specifications

References

Notes

Bibliography

Motor gliders